PBL may stand for:

Sports leagues 
 B.C. Premier Baseball League, a youth baseball league in British Columbia, Canada
 Philippine Basketball League, a men's basketball minor league in the Philippines
 Premier Basketball League, a men's professional basketball minor league in the United States
 Russian Professional Basketball League, the pre-eminent men's professional basketball league in Russia
 Premier Badminton League, a badminton league in India with players from all over the world

Other uses 
 Performance-based logistics
 Peripheral blood lymphocyte
 Perverted by Language, an album by The Fall
 Peter Lewis (businessman), an American businessman
 Phi Beta Lambda
 Philadelphia Belt Line Railroad
 Planetary boundary layer
 Policy Block List
 Polski Blok Ludowy, the Polish name for Polish Peasant Bloc, a short lived political party in Poland
 Phenomenon-based learning
 Problem-based learning
 Project-based learning
 Protected Bike Lane 
 Prototype-based language
 Publishing and Broadcasting Limited
 Public Broadcast Laboratory, a television program by National Educational Television (1967-1969)
 Puerto Bolívar Airport (ICAO: SKPB) non-directional beacon (Ident: PBL), a private airport in the Guajira Department of Colombia
 General Bartolomé Salom Airport (IATA: PBL, ICAO: SVPC), an airport serving Puerto Cabello in the Carabobo state of Venezuela